Landy Mattison (born January 4, 1983 in Raleigh, North Carolina) is an American soccer defender, who played professionally in the MLS, USL First and Second Divisions.

While born in North Carolina, Mattison grew up in Franklin, Tennessee.  He attended Centennial High School where he was an All State soccer player and apart of the United States men's national under-17 soccer team.  He also played basketball, baseball, and was an All Region football player.  He began his college career at Florida International University in 2001.  In 2002, he transferred to the University of Clemson.  In 2003 and 2004, he played for the Nashville Metros of the Premier Development League.  On April 15, 2005, Mattison signed with the Atlanta Silverbacks of the USL First Division.  In 2006, he signed with the Chicago Fire.  While he played games with the Fire Reserves, but saw no first team games.  While he spent most of the 2007 season with the Wilmington Hammerheads of the USL Second Division, he also saw time with the Chicago Fire Reserves in September.  In 2008, he continued to be called up to the Fire, this time for a September 25, 2008 non-league exhibition match with Tiburones Rojos de Veracruz.  He left the team at the end of the 2008 season.

References

External links
 Wilmington Hammerheads Player Profile

1983 births
Living people
American soccer players
Atlanta Silverbacks players
Chicago Fire FC players
Clemson Tigers men's soccer players
FIU Panthers men's soccer players
Nashville Metros players
USL League Two players
USL Second Division players
USL First Division players
Wilmington Hammerheads FC players
Association football defenders